Michel Albert (25 February 1930 – 19 March 2015) was a French economist.  He was born in Fontenay-le-Comte, Vendée and was the Permanent Secretary of the Académie des Sciences Morales et Politiques since 1 January 2005.

Biography
Michel Albert graduated from the Institut d'Études Politiques de Paris and is an alumnus of the École Nationale d'Administration. He became an inspector of finance in 1956.

He was Chairman of the Board and CEO of Assurances Générales de France (AGF) between 1982 and 1994.  From 1990 to 1993 he was president of the International Christian Union of Business Executives or UNIAPAC  On March 28, 1994, he was elected to the Académie des Sciences Morales et Politiques to the chair left vacant by the death of Henri Guitton. President of the Academy in 2004. Permanent Secretary for 2005-2010.

In 2009 he was decorated with the Grand Cross of the National Order of Merit.

He married Claude Albert (née Balland). He has four sons, Jean-Marc, Eric, Pierre-Emmanuel and Christopher and is the grandfather of nine children.

In his 1991 book Capitalisme contre Capitalisme, Michel Albert coined the term "Rhine capitalism" and warned, "The largest banks know, however, that they are literally 'too big to fail' and can count on a helping hand from government if the worst comes to the worst.... Thus, in yet another intriguing but ominous irony of history, 10 years of ultra-liberalism have resulted in a US financial system whose future may only be assured with the help of federal government handouts."

References

1930 births
2015 deaths
French chief executives
People from Fontenay-le-Comte
Members of the Académie des sciences morales et politiques
Sciences Po alumni
École nationale d'administration alumni
20th-century French  economists